The Pacific Southwest is a region of the United States. In its broadest definition, it encompasses five states: California,  Arizona, Hawaii, Utah, and part of Nevada. The region is one of cultural diversity seen all over. Several major urban areas lie within the region, including sunny Los Angeles.

Definition

There is no universally accepted definition of the phrase "Pacific Southwest." Whereas the related term Southwestern United States is generally used in a cultural or historical sense (for example, to refer to parts of the United States that were once part of the First Mexican Empire), the term "Pacific Southwest" is more commonly defined strictly by geographic or ecological factors.

For example, the American Society for Photogrammetry and Remote Sensing has a geographical application of the term, defining it as California, Arizona, Nevada and Hawaii. The Fish and Wildlife Service, on the other hand, uses an ecological approach to define it as California, Nevada, and the Klamath Basin (which includes parts of Oregon).

Ambiguity regarding the term is further compounded by the fact that even several United States federal agencies use different definitions. In addition to the Fish and Wildlife Service mentioned above, the Environmental Protection Agency defines Pacific Southwest as California, Nevada, Arizona and Hawaii, and the Forest Service defines it as California, Hawaii, and other U.S. islands in the Pacific Ocean.

Largest cities
Los Angeles Pop. 3,792,621
Phoenix Pop. 1,469,471
San Diego Pop. 1,301,617
Las Vegas Pop. 583,756
Tucson Pop. 520,116
Mesa Pop. 439,041
Honolulu Pop. 337,256

Culture
Cultures combine and collaborate in the Pacific Southwest. Traces of the Old American West can still be seen in some areas, especially in the deserts. Hip-hop is one of the many cultures prevalent here, most noticeable in Los Angeles. Polynesian culture flourishes in Hawaii, and Hawaiian Pidgin can still be heard in certain areas of the state. Spanish/Mexican culture is the most visible in the region, due to four of the five states having once been Spanish/Mexican possessions. Cowboys in the vaquero traditions of northern Mexico can be found in the Pacific Southwest, though less along the Pacific coast. Hawaii has its own version of the American cowboy, the paniolo. Asian culture is demonstrated in the region, especially in California and Hawaii.

Geography
The Pacific Southwest contains a vast diversity in environments. Sub-arctic conditions are common in the high mountains of the region, such as in the Sierra Nevada and on Mauna Kea. California, Nevada, and Arizona contain significant deserts, both hot and cold type. California is characterized primarily by hot summer and warm summer Mediterranean climates, in addition to 33 million acres of forests. Rainforests, both temperate and tropical, exist along the northernmost coast of California, as well as in certain areas of Hawaii. Hawaii has an array of tropical ecologies.

References

Further reading
 Weber, David J. “The Spanish Borderlands, Historiography Redux.” The History Teacher, 39#1 (2005), pp. 43–56. JSTOR, online.

Regions of the United States